Tinley Park is a commuter railroad station along Metra's Rock Island District line in Tinley Park, Illinois. The station is officially located at 6700 South Street between Oak Park Avenue and 66th Court, however parking is also available on the opposite side of the station along North Street between Oak Park Avenue and 67th Avenue, as well as the center of the block of Oak Park Avenue, 173rd Street, 67th Court and 172nd Street. A gravel lot on South Street, across from the station entrance, is used as temporary commuter parking for approximately 100 vehicles. A large transit-oriented development (TOD) is slated to replace the temporary parking spaces in early 2019. As of 2018, Tinley Park is the 57th busiest of Metra's 236 non-downtown stations, with an average of 917 weekday boardings.

As of 2022, Tinley Park is served by 21 trains in each direction on weekdays, by 10 inbound trains and 11 outbound trains on Saturdays, and by eight trains in each direction on Sundays.

Tinley Park Metra's elaborate  station features exterior stone, a roof, and wood rafters. A three-story clock tower offers views of Tinley Park and the adjacent Zabrocki Plaza, and contains Roman numerals engraved beneath four clocks in a circular fashion. It also contains an indoor/outdoor café that includes custom furnishings and internet jacks for laptop computers. Large glass windows provide a full view of the train tracks and promenade area. The station was honored by the American Institute of Architects as one of the 150 Great Places of Illinois.

Tracks
There are two tracks at Tinley Park. Trains from Chicago run on track 2 (the north track) and trains to Chicago run on track 1 (the south track.)

Bus connections
Pace
 386 South Harlem

References

External links

NRHS Blackhwak Chapter 2006 Image 
Station from Oak Park Avenue from Google Maps Street View
Station from 66th Court from Google Maps Street View

Metra stations in Illinois
Former Chicago, Rock Island and Pacific Railroad stations
Railway stations in Cook County, Illinois
Railway stations in the United States opened in 1890